Liod is a studio album by the electronic band Helium Vola.  It was released in 2004 through Chrom Records.

Track listing
 "Liod-1" – 1:52
 "Lucente Stella" – 2:56
 "Liod-2" – 1:16
 "Veni Veni – 6:10
 "Bitte Um Trost" – 4:10
 "Printemps" – 5:33
 "Ich Was Ein Chint So Wolgetan" – 3:55
 "Chumemin" – 5:11
 "Mahnung" – 2:27
 "Vagantenbeichte" – 5:04
 "Frauenklage" – 4:29
 "Ondas Do Mar" – 2:18
 "Liod-3" – 1:02
 "Zur Heilung" – 3:14
 "Liod-4" – 1:20
 "Engel" – 2:54
 "Dormi" – 5:06
 "La Fille" – 2:15
 "Gegen Einen Dämon" – 2:20
 "In Lichter Farbe Steht Der Wald" – 7:41

Credits
Cello - Jost Hecker

Harp, Hurdy-gurdy - Riccardo Delfino

Keyboards, Producer - Ernst Horn

Music By - Ernst Horn (tracks: 1, 3 to 20)

Photography, Artwork By - Tim Becker

Vocals - Sabine Lutzenberger

Vocals [Additional] - Tobias Schlierff

References 

2004 albums
Helium Vola albums